Pool B of the First Round of the 2006 World Baseball Classic was held at Chase Field, Phoenix and Scottsdale Stadium, Scottsdale, Arizona, United States from March 7 to 10, 2006.

Pool B was a round-robin tournament. Each team played the other three teams once, with the top two teams advancing to Pool 1.

Standings

Results
All times are Mountain Standard Time (UTC−07:00).

United States 2, Mexico 0

Canada 11, South Africa 8

Canada 8, United States 6

Mexico 10, South Africa 4

Mexico 9, Canada 1

United States 17, South Africa 0

External links
Official website

Pool B
World Baseball Classic Pool B
2000s in Phoenix, Arizona
Baseball competitions in Scottsdale, Arizona
International baseball competitions hosted by the United States
World Baseball Classic Pool B
Baseball competitions in Phoenix, Arizona